Olivia Crocicchia (born ) is an American actress from Connecticut. She is known for her role as Katy Gavin, the daughter of Denis Leary's character, on FX's Rescue Me from 2004 to 2011. She was also a co-lead in the Lifetime television film I Killed My BFF in 2015.

Filmography

References

External links

 

American television actresses
Actresses from Connecticut
Living people
Year of birth missing (living people)
21st-century American actresses
American film actresses